Public Enemy is an American hip hop group.

Public Enemy or Public Enemies may also refer to:

 Public enemy, a phrase to describe dangerous criminals and similar outlaws

Film
 The Public Enemy, a 1931 American film
 Public Enemies (1941 film), an American comedy film 
 Public Enemies (1996 film), an American crime film about Ma Barker
 Public Enemy (2002 film), a South Korean film
 Public Enemies (2009 film), an American crime drama about John Dillinger
 Superman/Batman: Public Enemies a 2009 animated superhero film

Literature 
 Public Enemies (book), a book by Gordon Korman in the "On the Run" series 2005–06
 Public Enemies: Dueling Writers Take On Each Other and the World, a 2001 book by Bernard-Henri Lévy with Michel Houellebecq
 Public Enemies: America's Greatest Crime Wave and the Birth of the FBI, 1933–34, a 2004 book by Bryan Burrough
 "Public Enemies", a story arc of Superman/Batman

Music
 Public Enemies (group), a Norwegian rhythm and blues group
 "Public Enemies", a 2020 song by Farid Bang
 "Public Enemy", a 1972 song by James Brown
 "Public Enemy", a 2018 song by Yellow Claw

Television
 Public Enemies (TV series), a 2012 British drama series
 Public Enemy (TV series), a 2016 Belgian crime series
 "Public Enemy", a 2012 episode of The Glades
 "Public Enemy", a 2015 episode of Arrow

Other uses
The Public Enemy (professional wrestling), a tag team

See also
 Enemy of the people (disambiguation)
 Enemy of the state (disambiguation)
 Public Enemy No. 1 (disambiguation)
 Public nuisance, a type of law offence